Downham Peak is a rock pyramid at the south side of the mouth of Sjogren Glacier, Trinity Peninsula. It was mapped from surveys by the Falkland Islands Dependencies Survey (FIDS) (1960–61), and was named by the UK Antarctic Place-Names Committee for Noel Y. Downham, a FIDS meteorological assistant at Hope Bay, who assisted in the triangulation of this area in 1961.

References 

Mountains of Trinity Peninsula